Springhill is a hamlet about a mile from Essington village, in the civil parish of Essington, in the South Staffordshire district, in the county of Staffordshire, England. In 2019 it had an estimated population of 538.

Amenities 
Springhill has a pub called the Why Not Inn Inn.

History 
The name "Springhill" means "hill with a copse". Springhill Colliery located east of Springhill appears to have been active in the 19th century.

References 

Hamlets in Staffordshire
South Staffordshire District